Swan Point is a rural locality in the local government area (LGA) of West Tamar in the Launceston LGA region of Tasmania. The 2016 census recorded a population of 282 for the state suburb of Swan Point. Historically the area has been mostly a summertime shack locality because of health risks from Launceston city's poorly designed sewerage system  frequently overflowing untreated sewage throughout Winter/early Spring. Historical orcharding has left chemical residues present in its soils and these pose a health risk for small children and pets.

https://www.abc.net.au/news/2018-02-16/turnbull-announces-funding-to-clean-up-tamar-river/9453816

History 
Swan Point prior to the 1970s, had substantial apple & pear orcharding. This has left residues of organochlorines, lead, arsenic, mercury and in particular DDT in the soils throughout the region. Lead and arsenic are persistent and become quite problematic when soil is turned over during housing construction excavation.  Sewerage treatment by Launceston city 30km south, is a major problem for the region because the Tamar Valley acts as a conduit and stormwater from rooves of Launceston houses, is plumbed to run into the sewage treatment ponds, making them frequently overflow during any substantial rainfall event. From 2014 until 2018, there was an epidemic of death of residents and dogs at Swan Point and adjoining suburb of Paper Beach with houses close to the Tamar River having much higher risks of occupants contracting brain/blood cancers.

Geography
The waters of the Tamar River Estuary form the north-western, northern and eastern boundaries.

Road infrastructure 
Route C728 (Deviot Road) runs along the south-west boundary. Access to the locality is provided by Paper Beach Road.

References

Towns in Tasmania
Localities of West Tamar Council